Axin-2 also known as axin-like protein (Axil) or axis inhibition protein 2 (AXIN2) or conductin is a protein that in humans is encoded by the AXIN2 gene.

Function 

The Axin-related protein, Axin2, presumably plays an important role in the regulation of the stability of beta-catenin in the Wnt signaling pathway, like its rodent homologs, mouse conductin/rat axil. In mouse, conductin organizes a multiprotein complex of APC (adenomatous polyposis of the colon), beta-catenin, glycogen synthase kinase 3-beta, and conductin, which leads to the degradation of beta-catenin.
The AXIN proteins attract substantial interest in cancer research as AXIN1 and AXIN2 work synergistically to control pro-oncogenic β-catenin signaling. Importantly, activity in the β-catenin destruction complex can be increased by tankyrase inhibitors and are a potential therapeutic option to reduce the growth of β-catenin-dependent cancers.

Clinical significance 

The deregulation of beta-catenin is an important event in the genesis of a number of malignancies. The AXIN2 gene has been mapped to 17q23-q24, a region that shows frequent loss of heterozygosity in breast cancer, neuroblastoma, and other tumors. Mutations in this gene have been associated with colorectal cancer with defective mismatch repair.

The most critical events of teeth, lip and palate formation occur almost concurrently. Hypodontia, defined as the congenital lack of one or more permanent teeth, is the most common dental abnormality found in humans and affects approximately 20% of the population worldwide. AXIS inhibition protein 2 (AXIN2) gene polymorphic variants may be associated with both hypodontia and oligodontia (characterized by the lack of six or more permanent teeth). Mutations of this gene have been found in individuals with colorectal carcinomas and liver tumors.

An AXIN2 mutation (1966C>T) detected in a Finnish family was associated with both tooth agenesis and colon neoplasia.  A second family is described from Michigan in 2011, with members describing severe oligodontia, sparse hair, and hundreds of colons polyps.  Another family was found by the Mayo Clinic in 2019.    In essence, the mutation seems to disrupt tooth development early in life and later contributes to the emergence of polyps and eventually colon cancer, an observation that suggests that the lack of permanent teeth may be an indicator of colon cancer susceptibility. Dentists may at the very least need to remain aware of the possible association, to be able to detect such cases of tooth agenesis and forward the patient to more complete genetic diagnostic examinations. This is a simple example of how molecular genetic discoveries today interact with traditional disciplines (Longtin, 2004).

Interactions 

AXIN2 has been shown to interact with  GSK3B.

Further reading

External links